Lkhagvatogoogiin Enkhriilen (born 28 December 1998) is a Mongolian judoka.

She is the bronze medallist of the 2018 Judo Grand Slam Düsseldorf in the -57 kg category.

References

External links
 

1998 births
Living people
Mongolian female judoka
Judoka at the 2018 Asian Games
21st-century Mongolian women